Ornativalva undella is a moth of the family Gelechiidae. It was described by Sattler in 1976. It is found in south-eastern Iran.

Adults have been recorded on wing in May.

References

Moths described in 1976
Ornativalva